Roy Battersby (born 20 April 1936) is a British television director, known for his work in drama productions such as Between The Lines, Inspector Morse, Cracker and A Touch of Frost. Early in his career, he made documentary features for the BBC programmes Tomorrow's World and Towards Tomorrow. In 2005, his film Red Mercury was shown at the Montreal World Film Festival.

He is married to actress Judy Loe and is the stepfather of actress Kate Beckinsale. Battersby was a Trotskyist for some years, becoming a full-time organiser for the now defunct Workers Revolutionary Party. The association had ended by 1981, but the connection led to his being blacklisted by the BBC.

Filmography

Awards

References

External links

1936 births
Living people
British television directors
People educated at Willesden County Grammar School
Workers Revolutionary Party (UK) members